Grete Heckscher (8 November 1901 – 6 October 1987) was a Danish fencer. She won a bronze medal in the women's individual foil competition at the 1924 Summer Olympics.

References

External links
 

1901 births
1987 deaths
Danish female foil fencers
Olympic fencers of Denmark
Fencers at the 1924 Summer Olympics
Olympic bronze medalists for Denmark
Olympic medalists in fencing
Sportspeople from Copenhagen
Medalists at the 1924 Summer Olympics